Trevor George Barry (born 14 June 1983) is a male high jumper from the Bahamas. His personal best high jump is 2.32 metres, achieved in the final at the 2011 World Championships in Athletics in Daegu, South Korea on 1 September 2011. Barry competed in college for Dickinson State University where he helped lead his team to 3 consecutive national championships.

At the 2006 Central American and Caribbean Games Barry won the silver medal in the high jump and finished sixth in the long jump.

Competition record

References

1983 births
Living people
Bahamian male high jumpers
Bahamian male long jumpers
Athletes (track and field) at the 2007 Pan American Games
Athletes (track and field) at the 2010 Commonwealth Games
Athletes (track and field) at the 2012 Summer Olympics
Athletes (track and field) at the 2016 Summer Olympics
Olympic athletes of the Bahamas
Pan American Games competitors for the Bahamas
Commonwealth Games silver medallists for the Bahamas
World Athletics Championships medalists
Dickinson State University alumni
World Athletics Championships athletes for the Bahamas
Commonwealth Games medallists in athletics
Central American and Caribbean Games silver medalists for the Bahamas
Competitors at the 2006 Central American and Caribbean Games
Competitors at the 2010 Central American and Caribbean Games
Central American and Caribbean Games medalists in athletics
Medallists at the 2010 Commonwealth Games